Zheltukhino-Shiryaysky is a rural locality (a khutor) in Shiryayevskoye Rural Settlement, Ilovlinsky District, Volgograd Oblast, Russia. The population was 290 as of 2010. There are 5 streets.

Geography 
Zheltukhino-Shiryaysky is located in steppe, on the Shiryay River, on the Volga Upland, 49 km northeast of Ilovlya (the district's administrative centre) by road. Shiryayevsky is the nearest rural locality.

References 

Rural localities in Ilovlinsky District